Subbbaraya Sarma is an Indian actor known for his works in Telugu cinema, theatre, and television. In a film career spanning more than forty years, Sarma played a variety of roles as a character actor and comedian.

In 1989, he received the Tri-Annual Best Actor for the play Onteddu Bandi written by L. B. Sriram. Sarma is best known for his acting in works such as Srivariki Premalekha (1984), Bava Bava Panneeru (1989), Yamaleela (1994), Subha Lagnam (1994), Mayalodu (1993), Matrudevobhava (1993), Gangotri (2003), Magadheera (2009), Top Hero (1994), Dharma Chakram (1996), Manasantha Nuvve (2001), Baahubali: The Beginning (2015), and Rudhramadevi (2015).

Selected filmography

References 

Living people
Indian male television actors
1947 births
Slapstick comedians
Indian male comedians
Male actors from Andhra Pradesh
Male actors in Telugu cinema
Indian male film actors
Nandi Award winners
People from Krishna district
Telugu male actors
Telugu comedians
Indian male stage actors
20th-century Indian male actors
21st-century Indian male actors